Ethyldienolone, also known as 17α-methyl-19-nor-δ9-testosterone, as well as 17α-methylestra-4,9-dien-17β-ol-3-one, is synthetic, orally active anabolic-androgenic steroid (AAS) and a 17α-alkylated derivative of 19-nortestosterone. It is slightly more active than methyltestosterone when given orally. Ethyldienolone is closely related to dienolone and methyldienolone.

See also 
 Dienedione
 Metribolone

References 

Androgens and anabolic steroids
Dienes
Estranes
Hepatotoxins